Ergün Batmaz (born July 16, 1967) is a Turkish European champion weightlifter competing in the lightweight division.

He represented Turkey at the 1988 and 1996 Summer Olympics without success. Ergün Batmaz became European champion at the 1997 European Weightlifting Championships held in Rijeka, Croatia.

Retired from active sport, he is currently coaching the weightlifting team of Büyükşehir Belediye Ankaraspor. He coached also women’s national weightlifting team and now coaching the men's team.

Achievements
World Weightlifting Championships

European Weightlifting Championships

References

External links
Ergün Batmaz at Database Weightlifting

1967 births
Place of birth missing (living people)
Living people
Turkish male weightlifters
Weightlifters at the 1988 Summer Olympics
Weightlifters at the 1996 Summer Olympics
Olympic weightlifters of Turkey
European champions in weightlifting
European champions for Turkey
European Weightlifting Championships medalists
World Weightlifting Championships medalists
20th-century Turkish people